The Jersey City Jerseys was a minor league baseball team based in Jersey City, New Jersey that played in the International League for two seasons, 1960 and 1961. It was the AAA affiliate of the Cincinnati Reds.  The team's home stadium was Roosevelt Stadium. The team began life in Havana, Cuba and was moved to Jersey City following the Cuban Revolution. The team folded and moved to Jacksonville, Florida, becoming the Jacksonville Suns.

History
The team began in 1946 in Havana, Cuba as the Havana Cubans, later the Havana Sugar Kings, which joined the International League in 1954. The team then ended up winning the 1959 Little World Series in seven games over the Minneapolis Millers of the American Association. However, the next year, Fidel Castro nationalized all U.S.-owned enterprises in Cuba, and on July 8, 1960, Baseball Commissioner Ford Frick (under pressure from U.S. Secretary of State Christian Herter) announced that the Sugar Kings would be moving to Jersey City, New Jersey and be renamed the Jersey City Jerseys.

The team featured many Cuban and Latino players including Leo Cárdenas, Mike Cuellar, Vic Davalillo, Julián Javier, and Cookie Rojas. However, the Jerseys would last only one more season (1961) before folding due to poor attendance. The franchise was then sold to the Cleveland Indians, who moved it to Jacksonville, Florida, where it became the Jacksonville Suns.

See also
Jersey City Skeeters
Jersey City Giants
Jersey City Indians
Jersey City A's

References
The Hudson Reporter: Jersey City's Baseball History

Jersey City Jerseys
Jersey City Jerseys
Jersey City Jerseys
Baseball teams established in 1960
Sports clubs disestablished in 1961
Professional baseball teams in New Jersey
1960 establishments in New Jersey
1961 disestablishments in New Jersey
Baseball teams disestablished in 1961